Brooklyn Law School (BLS) is a private law school in New York City. Founded in 1901, it has approximately 1,100 students. Brooklyn Law School's faculty includes 60 full-time faculty, 15 emeriti faculty, and a number of adjunct faculty.

Brooklyn Law School alumni include New York City Mayor David Dinkins, US Senator Norm Coleman, judges Frank Altimari (US Court of Appeals for the Second Circuit) and Edward R. Korman (US District Court for the Eastern District of New York), attorneys Stephen Dannhauser (Chairman, Weil, Gotshal & Manges), Myron Trepper (co-Chairman, Willkie Farr & Gallagher), Allen Grubman (entertainment lawyer), and Bruce Cutler (criminal defense lawyer), CEOs Barry Salzberg (Deloitte) and Marty Bandier (Sony/ATV Music Publishing), and billionaire real estate developers Leon Charney and Larry Silverstein.

History

The origins of Brooklyn Law School can be traced back to the Pratt Institute in Clinton Hill, Brooklyn, when, in the 1890s, the school established its Department of Commerce. Because of its overwhelming popularity, the Department of Commerce broke off from the main Institute and formed its own school under the guidance of Norman P. Heffley, personal secretary to Charles Pratt. The Heffley School of Commerce originally shared facilities with Pratt.

In 1901, William Payson Richardson and Norman P. Heffley reorganized the Heffley School to become Brooklyn Law School, the first law school on Long Island. Using space provided by Heffley's business school, the law school opened on September 30, 1901, with five faculty members (including Richardson as dean and Heffley as president), and two special lecturers.

The year began with five students and ended with 28. In late 1901, the Board of Regents of the State of New York granted a charter to the law school. The law school became fully accredited by the American Bar Association and is a member of the Association of American Law Schools. The law school's curriculum is registered with and approved by the New York State Education Department.

From its opening, Brooklyn Law School opened its door to minorities, women, and immigrants, and it offered night classes for those with full-time jobs. Dean Richardson also allowed students who had difficulty paying tuition to remain enrolled on credit. The school moved twice between 1901 and 1928, when it finally moved into the first building designed and built specifically for it at 375 Pearl Street in downtown Brooklyn. 

The school was affiliated with St. Lawrence University from 1903 to 1943. World War II struck Brooklyn Law School especially hard, and by 1943 enrollment was down to 174 students. St. Lawrence University, which until then operated Brooklyn Law School and conferred its degrees, decided to shut down the school. Alumni organized and negotiated the repurchase of the school's assets, ensuring that Brooklyn Law School would operate as an independent institution.

Rankings
 New York Law Journal readers voted Brooklyn Law School as the #2 Best Overall Law School in 2017 and 2018.
New York Law Journal readers voted Brooklyn Law School as the #2 General LL.M. Program in 2017 and 2018.
 Business Insider ranked Brooklyn Law School as one of the “Best Law Schools in the Northeast” in 2016.
 Billboard Magazine listed Brooklyn Law School in the Top Schools of the Top Music Lawyers in 2017.
 Hollywood Reporter listed Brooklyn Law School in the Top 12 Entertainment Law Schools in 2017.
 The 2016 Leiter Report ranked Brooklyn Law School's faculty 26th in the nation for having the highest percentage of most-cited tenured professors.
 The 2017 Leiter Report ranked Brooklyn Law School's faculty 30th in the nation for “scholarly excellence.”
 The 2021 edition of U.S. News & World Report ranked Brooklyn Law School as the 83rd overall best law school
 The 2022 edition of U.S. News & World Report ranked Brooklyn Law School as the 81st overall best law school.
 The 2023 edition of U.S. News & World Report ranked Brooklyn Law School as the 98th (tie) overall best law school.

Bar passage rate and career prospects
In 2017, 78.6% of the law school's first-time test takers passed the bar exam, placing the law school as the 8th-highest among New York's 15 law schools.  Of 369 graduates in 2016, nine months after graduation 323 were employed. Alumni live in 49 states and over 25 countries after graduation. The law school was ranked 46th of all law schools nationwide by the National Law Journal in terms of sending the highest percentage of 2018 graduates to the largest 100 law firms in the US (9%).

In 2013, 94% of the law school's first-time test takers passed the New York bar exam, third-best among New York's 15 law schools.

In 2012, five Brooklyn Law School graduates filed a class action lawsuit, which was dismissed the following year, alleging consumer fraud and common law fraud.  As part of a series of identical lawsuits against law schools nationwide, the complaint alleged that the law school administration incorrectly reported employment and salary information for the purpose of enticing students to attend the law school.  Prior to the lawsuit, Brooklyn Law School had claimed that 95% or more of graduates found employment within 9 months of graduation, without always distinguishing between full-time, part-time, and non-JD-required employment (which breakdown ABA/NALP rules did not require at the time of the statistics at issue in the suit, but which breakdown has been required since 2012).  In April 2013, NY State Supreme Court Justice David Schmidt dismissed the lawsuit, finding that the school's disclaimers on its employment and salary data warned graduates that their own post-grad earnings may not measure up to the data.

Of the law school's 368 graduates in 2017, nine months after graduation all were employed other than 26 who were seeking employment, and 4 who were not seeking employment (the employment status of 4 was unknown); 269 had secured jobs practicing law, and 40 had taken a J.D. advantage position.  Brooklyn Law School's Law School Transparency under-employment score was 16.2%, indicating the percentage of the Class of 2017 unemployed, pursuing an additional degree, or working in a non-professional, short-term, or part-time job nine months after graduation.

The law school was ranked # 46 of all law schools nationwide by the National Law Journal in terms of sending the highest percentage of 2018 graduates to the largest 100 law firms in the US (9%).

Location and facilities

Brooklyn Law School's academic and administrative buildings and main student residence is located in Downtown Brooklyn, near many federal and state courts and corporate and public interest law offices.  Brooklyn Law School's main academic building at 250 Joralemon Street houses classrooms, faculty offices, student journals, a conference center, dining hall, and a four-story law library with 586,000 volumes. The office building nearby at 111 Livingston Street houses many of the law school's clinics, legal writing center, and administrative offices.

Brooklyn Law School guarantees housing in its residences to all entering students. The largest residence is Feil Hall, a 22-story building at 205 State Street that opened in 2005. Designed by noted architect Robert A. M. Stern, Dean of the Yale School of Architecture, it accommodates about 360 students in 239 furnished apartments of varying sizes, and includes a conference center and café.

Faculty

Brooklyn Law School's faculty includes 60 full-time professors, 15 emeriti faculty, and a number of adjunct faculty. The law school draws on a large body of practitioners, public officials, and judges as adjunct faculty to teach specialized courses in many areas of law, including international sales law, securities law, real estate development, trial advocacy, business crimes, corporate litigation, sports law, and border and homeland security law. In addition, in any given semester, visiting professors come from all over the world to teach at the school.

The law school is home to several well-known scholars, including torts professor Aaron Twerski, and Elizabeth Schneider, an expert on gender, law, and civil procedure. Both were highly ranked in Brian Leiter’s survey of “Most Cited Law Professors by Specialty."

Other notable professors include Roberta Karmel, a former Commissioner of the Securities and Exchange Commission and columnist for the New York Law Journal, and Susan Herman, president of the American Civil Liberties Union (ACLU).  In recent years, the law school has hired a number of new junior faculty members whose work draws on a variety of influences to contribute scholarship in areas as diverse as copyfraud, law and religion, international business law, land use planning, and the secondary mortgage market.

Journals and competitions

Journals
The law school publishes four student-edited law journals: the Brooklyn Law Review, Brooklyn Journal of International Law, the Journal of Law and Policy, and the Brooklyn Journal of Corporate, Financial, and Commercial Law.

Moot Court
The law school has both trial and appellate advocacy moot court divisions. Each year, it enters approximately 30 teams in national moot court competitions. These competitions span all areas of the law, including family law, criminal procedure, white-collar crime, and international law.

In 2011, Brooklyn Law School took home top international, national, and regional titles. Its teams won first place in the Irving R. Kaufman Memorial Moot Court Competition, and were first place Champions in the Domenick L. Gabrielli National Family Law Competition.  They were also Semi-Finalists in the New York Region of the New York City Bar National Moot Court Competition, Semi-Finalists in the Phillip C. Jessup International Law Moot Court Competition (students won Third Best Brief and Sixth Best Oralist), Semi-Finalists in the National Environmental Law Moot Court Competition (students won Best Oralists in the Preliminary Rounds), Semi-Finalists in the Evan A. Evans Constitutional Law Moot Court Competition, Semi-Finalists for the Navy JAG Corps Moot Court Competition, and Semi-Finalists in the Duberstein Bankruptcy Moot Court Competition. In 2019, the school won the regional round of the prestigious Texas Young Lawyers Association National Trial Competition, advancing to the National Round, the second time in two years.

Jerome Prince Evidence Competition
Each year, Brooklyn Law School hosts the Jerome Prince Memorial Evidence Competition, a national moot court competition. Named in honor of the late Brooklyn Law School Dean and renowned evidence scholar, the competition draws over 30 law school teams from across the country. Many students from the Moot Court Honor Society are involved in the coordination of the Prince Competition, and a few students have an opportunity to work with faculty members to research and write the problem – an issue at the forefront of evidentiary law – that is used in the Competition.

Academics

Admissions

For 2022, Brooklyn Law School accepted 46.22% of applicants with 21.56% of those accepted enrolling. For those enrolling full time, the average LSAT score was 160 and the average undergraduate GPA was 3.54.

Offerings

Brooklyn Law School offers students over 190 courses and seminars in the law.

Centers

Each Brooklyn Law School center focuses on a specific area of the law and hosts lectures, symposia, forums, and round-table discussions that address emerging issues.
 Center for Urban Business Entrepreneurship (CUBE): Explores legal issues surrounding entrepreneurship, and provides effective legal representation and support for new commercial and not-for-profit businesses, while also training business-oriented law students to advise and participate in these sectors.
 Center for the Study of Business Law and Regulation: Unites the law school's existing diverse business and commercial law programs by providing a forum for scholarship that offers new perspectives on and solutions to real world business law and regulatory issues.
 Dennis J. Block Center for the Study of International Business Law: Established by the law school to study and shape international business law and policy.
 Center for Law Language and Cognition: Explores how developments in the cognitive sciences – including psychology, neuroscience and linguistics – have implications for the law at both theoretical and practical levels.
 Center for Health, Science and Public Policy: Offers students substantive knowledge and practical skills related to health and science law.

Clinics

In 2009, Brooklyn Law School clinical program was ranked 28th in the nation. In 2010, The National Jurist ranked BLS fourth in the country for its public service work, largely influenced by its clinical program. The clinics specialize in the areas of bankruptcy, securities arbitration, immigration, entrepreneurship, technology, criminal law, real estate practice, intellectual property, and mediation. Students represent individual clients, groups, and businesses and appear in state, federal, and administrative courts, on both the trial and appellate levels. Brooklyn Law School created a new mandate in 2014 that requires students to complete at least one clinic or externship course before graduation. Among the law school's clinics include:
 The Advocates for Adults With Intellectual and Developmental Disability (AAIDD) Clinic represents low-income New Yorkers and their families in a variety of civil matters that impact adults with intellectual and developmental disabilities, and provides the opportunity for students to advocate in diverse areas of law ranging from public benefits, guardianship, housing and access to government services.
 The Brooklyn Law Incubator and Policy Clinic, (BLIP),  functions like a law firm that represents Internet, new media, communications, and other tech entrepreneurs and innovators on both business and policy advocacy. Students work with clients on transactional, litigation, policy, and other advocacy projects and interact and strategize with members of the entrepreneurial, technology and financial communities, as well as with legislators, regulators and other policymakers.
 Capital Defender and Federal Habeas Clinic affords students the opportunity to represent death row inmates (post-conviction) in other states and defendants in New York who have filed federal habeas corpus petitions. The work consists of filing petitions in the U.S. Supreme Court.
 Community Development Clinic provides opportunities for students to represent community development corporations, cultural institutions, affordable housing providers, and small businesses that serve under-represented communities.

Fellowship programs
Brooklyn Law School offers several paid fellowships for students seeking to further enrich their legal interests.
 Public Interest/Public Service (PipS): Fellows work full-time in entry-level positions at nonprofit organizations or government agencies partnering with Brooklyn Law School, receiving appropriate training and supervision, as well as attend a classroom component in the evening at Brooklyn Law School. After nine months of work with one of Brooklyn Law School's partners, upon graduation, Fellows take a break to study for the bar exam before returning to their Fellowship placement for a full year.
 International Human Rights Fellowship: Select students engage in a concentrated study in the field of international human rights and perform international human rights work abroad.
 Center for Health Science and Public Policy Fellowship: Students who have demonstrated academic or professional achievement in the areas of health, public health, science, and biotechnology undertake a major research project on a legal or policy issue related to these fields.
 International Business Law Fellowship: Students who plan to pursue careers in the field of international business law participate in programs hosted by the Dennis J. Block Center for the Study of International Business Law, as well as a variety of mentoring and enrichment experiences.
 Sparer Public Interest Law Fellowship: Students chosen for this nationally recognized program are placed at public interest organizations across the United States and abroad.
 Trade Secret Institute Fellowship: Fellows in this program are responsible for identifying key cases to include in the Trade Secrets Institute database through research on doctrinal issues related to trade secrets.
 Students work with faculty and alumni who are Zaretsky committee members to develop program content and materials for the annual Zaretsky Roundtable, a discussion on cutting-edge commercial and bankruptcy law topics.

LL.M. degree program
Brooklyn Law School offers an LL.M. program for foreign-trained lawyers. The program facilitates specialized study in three subject areas: business law, intellectual property law, and refugee and immigration law.

Joint degree programs
Brooklyn Law School offers five joint degree programs:
 J.D./Master of Business Administration: Brooklyn Law School and Baruch College jointly sponsor a program leading to the degrees of Juris Doctor (J.D.) and a Master of Business Administration (M.B.A.) in Business Administration and Policy.
 J.D./Master in City and Regional Planning: Brooklyn Law School and Pratt Institute jointly sponsor a program leading to the degrees of Juris Doctor (J.D.) and Master of Science (M.S.) in City and Regional Planning.
 J.D./Master in Urban Planning: Brooklyn Law School and Hunter College's Graduate Program in the Department of Urban Planning (Urban Affairs and Planning) jointly sponsor a program leading to the degrees of Juris Doctor (J.D.) and Master of Urban Planning (M.U.P.).
 J.D./Master in Library and Information Science: Brooklyn Law School and the Graduate School of Information and Library Science of Pratt Institute jointly sponsor a program leading to the degrees of Juris Doctor (J.D.) and Master of Science in Library and Information Science (M.S.L.I.S.).
 LL.M./Master in Library and Information Science: Brooklyn Law School and Pratt Institute jointly sponsor a dual degree program for those who have already earned a J.D. The program leads to a M.S.L.I.S. and LL.M. in Information Law and Society.

Certificate programs
Brooklyn Law School offers five certificate programs:

 Certificate in Business Law
 Certificate in Criminal Law
 Certificate in IP, Media, and Information Law
 Certificate in International Law
 Certificate in Real Estate

Public service programs
Brooklyn Law School has created one of the nation's leading public service programs. Its Public Service Office provides individual counseling and information on summer and academic year externships, steering students toward pro bono opportunities, and helping students apply for postgraduate fellowships as well as employment opportunities.

Study abroad

Summer abroad
Brooklyn Law School sponsors two summer abroad programs each year. Students study international and comparative law for two weeks in one of two locations: Beijing or Bologna.
 The Beijing Program is hosted at China's University of International Business and Economics (UIBE). The program offers students the opportunity to study international bankruptcy and Chinese law. Courses are taught in English by faculty from BLS, with lectures by members of UBIE's Law Faculty. The program also allows time for visits to local cultural and legal institutions and for meeting Chinese law students.
 The Bologna Program is hosted by the University of Bologna. Founded in the 11th century, it is the oldest university in Europe, and a center of law study since the Middle Ages. Courses in international business law and comparative topics are taught by faculty from American and European law schools.

Semester abroad

 Exchange Program with Bucerius Law School in Hamburg, Germany
Each year, the law school selects two students to attend Bucerius Law School during the fall semester while two Bucerius students study at Brooklyn Law School. The Bucerius Law School Program in International and Comparative Business Law is designed to develop and expand students' understanding of the forces that shape international business law and offers a unique opportunity to gain first-hand knowledge of German, European, and international law. Courses are taught in English by a combination of American law school professors and international professors of law.
 Exchange Program with University of Essex in Colchester, England
The University of Essex exchange program allows two Brooklyn Law School students every semester to study at the University of Essex while two English students are chosen to study at the law school for a full academic year. The focus of the program is on international human rights and European Union law.
 Exchange Program with University College Cork in Cork, Ireland
Brooklyn Law School's exchange program with University College Cork (UCC) gives two Brooklyn Law School students each semester the opportunity to study at UCC, a college founded in 1845 with a Law Faculty that is the largest department in the university. Two Cork students spend an academic year at the law school. Brooklyn Law School students have the ability to learn many legal subjects from an Irish law perspective, as well as many topics from an international and comparative stance.
 Exchange Program with Hong Kong University in Hong Kong, China
Two Brooklyn Law School students have the option of studying in Hong Kong for a semester in exchange for two Hong Kong University students attending Brooklyn Law School for the year. Due to China's rapid social and economic development and Hong Kong's location in the Pacific Rim, the program courses focus mostly on Chinese commercial law, human-rights law and international corporate and financial law. Except for some courses offered in the LL.M. program (e.g., Chinese Law), the course instruction is in English.
 Exchange Program with Universidad Torcuato Di Tello in Buenos Aires, Argentina
Brooklyn Law School recently added this program to allow students to study law in Spanish from a Civil Law system perspective. The program highlights courses in tax law, law and economics, business law, law and finance, criminal law, and law and public policy.
 Exchange Program with Tel Aviv University in Tel Aviv, Israel
Two Brooklyn Law School students in their second year also have the new opportunity to attend Tel Aviv University, home of the Cegla Center for Interdisciplinary Research of the Law, in the Spring semester. Students will be able to take a variety of courses touching upon international and comparative law, as well as the option to study Hebrew.

Student organizations
Brooklyn Law School has over 40 student-led organizations, which reflect the diversity of the student body.

Deans
 
 William P. Richardson (1901–45)
 William B. Carswell (1945–53)
 Jerome Prince (1953–71)
 Raymond Lisle (1971–77)
 I. Leo Glasser (1977–81)
 David G. Trager (1983–93)
 Joan G. Wexler (1994–2010)
 Michael Gerber (interim dean; 2010–12)
 Nicholas Allard (2012–18)
 Maryellen Fullerton (interim dean; 2018–19)
 Michael T. Cahill (2019–present)

Notable faculty
 Alex Stein, Justice on the Supreme Court of Israel. Law professor 2016-18.
 K. Sabeel Rahman, Senior Counselor in the Office of Information and Regulatory Affairs and former President of Demos. Associate Professor of Law 2015-2019. Currently on leave.

Notable alumni

Academia
Vincent Martin Bonventre, 1976, Justice Robert H. Jackson Distinguished Professor at Albany Law School
William B. Carswell, 1908, Dean of Brooklyn Law School; New York (NY) State Senator, and Associate Justice of the NY Supreme Court, Appellate Division.
I. Leo Glasser, 1948, Dean of Brooklyn Law School; Judge on the U.S. District Court for the Eastern District of New York.
Daniel Gutman, 1922, Dean of New York Law School, NY State Senator, and NY State Assemblyman.
Jerome Prince, 1933, Dean of Brooklyn Law School; evidence scholar and author of Prince on Evidence.
Harold Rosenberg, 1927, professor of Social Thought in the Art Department at the University of Chicago
Patricia Schiller (born Pearl Silverman), 1934,  professor of Obstetrics and Gynecology at Howard University College of Medicine
Edward V. Sparer, 1959, professor at Yale Law School and University of Pennsylvania Law School; founded Mobilization for Justice and considered the "father of welfare law."
Stephen Teret, 1969, professor of Health Policy and Management, and Associate Dean, at the Johns Hopkins Bloomberg School of Public Health

Business

William F. Aldinger III, 1975, CEO of HSBC Finance Corporation and Capmark (now Ally Financial).
Leon Charney, 1964, real estate tycoon and billionaire.
Charles S. Cohen, 1977, CEO of Cohen Brothers Realty Corporation and billionaire.
Milton Cooper, 1953, CEO of Kimco Realty Corporation.
Jeffrey Feil, 1973, real estate developer and CEO of The Feil Organization.
Noah J. Hanft, 1976, General Counsel, MasterCard International.
 Lon Jacobs, 1981, Chief Legal Officer, Senior Executive Vice President, and Group General Counsel of News Corporation.
Alfred J. Koeppel 1957, New York real estate developer
Marvin Kratter, 1939, real estate investor, head of the Boston Celtics.
Nat Lefkowitz, co-chairman of the William Morris Agency
 Bernie Madoff, class of 1963 (left after first year), financial fraudster
Fred Rosen, former CEO of Ticketmaster, co-founder of the Bel Air Homeowners Alliance.
George H. Ross, 1953, Executive Vice President and Senior Counsel, Trump Organization; appeared on two seasons of The Apprentice.
Barry Salzberg, 1977, CEO of Deloitte & Touche.
 Larry Silverstein, 1955, billionaire real estate investor and developer; owns and is developing the World Trade Center complex in Lower Manhattan.
Stuart Subotnick, 1968, partner and Chief Operating Officer, Metromedia; one of 400 wealthiest people in the US; Chairman, Brooklyn Law School Board of Trustees.
Joel Wiener, 1974,  CEO of Pinnacle Group, real estate developer and billionaire.

Government

Victor Anfuso, 1927, Democratic Member of the U.S. House of Representatives from New York (NY), 8th Congressional District.
 Herman Badillo, 1954, Democratic Member of the U.S. House of Representatives from NY, 21st and 22nd Districts; Bronx Borough President. First Puerto Rican elected to these posts (outside of Puerto Rico).
 John J. Bennett Jr., 1923, NY State Attorney General (Democrat)
Abraham Bernstein, 1941, NY State Senator (Democrat)
Frank J. Brasco, 1957, Democratic Member of the U.S. House of Representatives from NY, 11th District.
James F. Brennan, 1982, NY State Assemblyman, 44th District (Democrat)
John D. Clarke, 1911, Republican Member of the U.S. House of Representatives from NY, 34th District.
Sol Chaikin, 1940, President of the International Ladies Garment Workers Union
Norm Coleman, attended 1972–'74, U.S. Senator from Minnesota, Mayor of Saint Paul, Minnesota (1994–2002).
Steven Cymbrowitz, 1990, NY State Assemblyman, 45th District (Democrat).
John J. Delaney, 1927, Democratic Member of the U.S. House of Representatives from NY, 7th District.

 David Dinkins, 1956, Mayor of New York City (1990–93); first African American to hold that office (Democrat).
Jeffrey Dinowitz, 1979, NY State Assemblyman, 81st District (Democrat).
Morris M. Edelstein, 1909, Democratic Member of the U.S. House of Representatives from NY, 14th District.
James H. Fay, 1929, Democratic Member of the U.S. House of Representatives from NY, 16th District.
Joseph V. Flynn, 1906, Democratic Member of the U.S. House of Representatives from NY, 3rd District.
 Leonard Garment, 1949, acting special counsel to U.S. President Richard Nixon, and 2005 National Medal of Arts recipient.
Howard Golden, 1958, Brooklyn Borough President (Democrat)
 Frieda B. Hennock, 1924, first woman Federal Communications Commission Commissioner.
Edward Jurith, 1976, Acting Director of the Office of National Drug Control Policy
Howard L. Lasher, 1968, Democratic NY State Assemblyman,  46th and 47th Districts. First Orthodox Jew elected to state office in NY State.
Henry J. Latham, 1931, Republican Member of the U.S. House of Representatives from NY, 3rd and 4th Districts.
Norman J. Levy, 1958, NY State Senator (Republican)
John Marchi, 1953, NY State Senator (Republican)
Christopher Mega, 1953, NY State Senator, Assemblyman, and judge (Republican).
George M. Michaels, 1933, NY State Assemblyman (Democrat).
Abraham J. Multer, 1922, Democratic Member of the U.S. House of Representatives from NY, 13th and 14th Districts.
Thomas V. Ognibene, 1974, Republican member of the New York City Council, 30th District; held the position of Council minority leader.
Rafael Piñeiro, 1980, New York City First Deputy Police Commissioner.
Bertram L. Podell, 1949, Democratic Member of the U.S. House of Representatives from NY, 13th District.
David M. Potts, 1926, 1933, Republican Member of the U.S. House of Representatives from NY, 26th District.
 Morton Povman, 1955, Democratic New York City Council Member
Benjamin S. Rosenthal, 1949, Democratic Member of the U.S. House of Representatives from NY 6th, 7th, and 8th Districts.
Sean M. Ryan, 1992, NY State Assemblyman (Democrat)
Irving H. Saypol, 1927, United States Attorney for the Southern District of New York
Nicholas Scoppetta, 1962, 31st New York City Fire Commissioner and first Commissioner of the Administration for Children's Services.
 Sheldon Silver, 1968, Democratic Speaker of the New York State Assembly (1994–present), the second-longest speakership in NY State history.
Leonard Silverman, 1954, five-term NY State Assemblyman, former Chairman of the Committee on Insurance, and Judge for the NY State Court of Claims.
 Herbert J. Simins, 1958, New York City Commissioner of Public Works, Nassau County Commissioner of Public Works.
Lawrence J. Smith, 1964, Democratic Member of the U.S. House of Representatives from Florida, 16th District.
Percy Sutton, 1950, first African-American Manhattan Borough President, civil rights activist, founder of Inner City Broadcasting Corporation.
Edward Thompson, 1936, New York City Fire Commissioner
Lester D. Volk, 1911, Republican Member of the U.S. House of Representatives from NY, 10th District.
 Benjamin Ward, 1965, New York City Police Commissioner.
Ivan Warner, 1955, NY State Senator (Democrat)
Mark Weprin, 1992, NY State Assemblyman, 24th District (Democrat).
Saul Weprin, 1951, Democratic Speaker of the NY State Assembly (1991–94).
Paul Windels, 1909, Corporation Counsel of New York City (1934–37)

Judges

U.S. Court of Appeals
Frank Altimari, 1951, Judge on the U.S. Court of Appeals for the Second Circuit

U.S. District Court
Matthew T. Abruzzo, 1910, Judge for the U.S. District Court for the Eastern District of NY
Henry Bramwell, 1948, first African-American Judge appointed to the U.S. District Court for the Eastern District of NY.
Mark Americus Costantino, 1947, Judge for the U.S. District Court for the Eastern District of NY.
 I. Leo Glasser, (see Academia above)
 Sterling Johnson Jr., 1966, Senior Judge of the U.S. District Court for the Eastern District of NY.
 Harold Maurice Kennedy, 1925, Judge of the U.S. District Court for the Eastern District of NY.
Edward R. Korman, 1966, Chief Judge of the U.S. District Court for the Eastern District of NY.
Shirley Wohl Kram, 1950, Judge for the U.S. District Court for the Southern District of NY.
Mary Johnson Lowe, 1954, Judge for the U.S. District Court for the Southern District of NY.
Ramon E. Reyes, Jr., 1992, Magistrate Judge for the U.S. District Court for the Eastern District of New York.
Nelson Roman, 1989, Judge for the U.S. District Court for the Southern District of NY.
George Rosling, 1923, Judge for the U.S. District Court for the Eastern District of NY.
Arthur Donald Spatt, 1949, Judge on the U.S. District Court for the Eastern District of NY.
Jennifer P. Wilson, 2001, Judge for the U.S. District Court for the Middle District of Pennsylvania.
 Stephen Victor Wilson, 1967, Judge on the U.S. District Court for the Central District of California.

U.S. Court of International Trade
Claire R. Kelly, 1993,  Judge of the U.S. Court of International Trade
 James Lopez Watson, 1951, Judge of the U.S. Court of International Trade.

U.S. Customs Court
Webster Oliver, 1911, Chief Judge of the U.S. Customs Court

State

Harold Birns, 1938, Associate Justice of the NY Appellate Division, First Department
Bernard Botein, 1924, Presiding Justice of the NY State Supreme Court, Appellate Division, First Department, and President of the New York City Bar Association.
John Carro, 1956, Associate Justice of the NY Appellate Division, First Department, first Puerto Rican to be designated an Appellate Court Justice, and founding partner of the largest Latino-owned law firm in New York.
 Noach Dear, 1991, New York Supreme Court judge
Steven W. Fisher, 1972, Associate Justice of the NY Appellate Division, Second Department
Rachel Freier, 2005, Civil Court judge for the Kings County 5th judicial district in NY State, first Hasidic Jewish woman to be elected as a civil court judge in NY State, and first Hasidic woman to serve in public office in US history.
Julius J. Gans, 1919, member of the New York State Assembly and New York Supreme Court Justice
E. Leo Milonas, 1960, partner of Pillsbury Winthrop Shaw Pittman LLP; former Associate Justice, Associate Justice of the NY Appellate Division, First Department, and Chief Administrative Judge of the State of NY.
Frank D. O'Connor, 1934, Judge of the Appellate Division of the NY State Supreme Court, Queens District Attorney, President of the New York City Council.
Ann Pfau, 1984, Chief Administrative Judge of the NY State Unified Court System.
Raja Rajeswari, 1998, Judge of the Criminal Court of NYC, first India-born woman to be appointed a judge in New York City
Rosalyn Richter, 1979, Associate Justice of the NY Appellate Division of the Supreme Court, First  Department
Irma Vidal Santaella, 1961, 1967, justice of the NY State Supreme Court, first Puerto Rican woman admitted to the NY State Bar and first Puerto Rican woman to be elected to the NY State Supreme Court.
William C. Thompson, 1954, justice of the NY State Supreme Court, Appellate Division, Second Department; founding member of nation’s first community development corporation, Bedford Stuyvesant Restoration Corporation.
Peter Tom, 1975, first Asian-American appellate justice in NY State
Edwin Torres, 1957, NY State Supreme Court justice and best-selling author of crime novels.
Moses M. Weinstein, 1934, justice of the NY Supreme Court, Appellate Division, Second Department, and Acting Speaker of the NY State Assembly.

Media and entertainment

Marty Bandier, 1965, CEO of Sony/ATV Music Publishing.
Himan Brown, 1931, producer of radio programs, member of the Radio Hall of Fame and recipient of the Peabody Award
Sergio De La Pava, novelist 
 Irving Fein, 1936, Emmy Award-winning TV and film producer, and manager of Jack Benny and George Burns.
Kevin Heffernan, actor, writer, producer, and director
 Irving "Swifty" Lazar, 1931, talent agent and deal-maker. Dubbed "Swifty" by Humphrey Bogart when he put together three major deals for Bogart in a single day.
Errol Louis, 2005,  journalist and television show host
 Russell T. Lewis, 1973, CEO of The New York Times Company.
Bruce Ricker, 1970, jazz and blues documentarian
 Geraldo Rivera, 1969, host of the newsmagazine program Geraldo at Large; appears regularly on Fox News Channel.
 Paul Simon, 1963 (attended), 12-Grammy Award-winning musician, songwriter, and producer.
Brian Sullivan, 2003, television news anchor and business journalist.
 Hy Zaret, 1930s, lyricist and composer; co-author of 1955 hit "Unchained Melody."

Private practice

Frank J. Aquila, 1983, corporate lawyer at Sullivan & Cromwell.
Mark M. Baker, 1972, criminal defense attorney
Dennis J. Block, 1967, Senior Chairman, Global Corporate M&A Practice, Greenberg Traurig
 Bruce Cutler, 1974, and Gerald Shargel, 1969, criminal defense lawyers known for defending high-profile defendants including John Gotti
Stephen J. Dannhauser, 1975, Chairman, Weil, Gotshal & Manges LLP
Herbert Dicker, 1955, founding partner, Wilson Elser Moskowitz Edelman & Dicker LLP
Julia V. Grilli, 1914, suffragist, active with the Italian Welfare League
Allen Grubman, 1967, entertainment lawyer.
 Leonard Grunstein, 1975, real estate attorney and philanthropist.
 Alfred S. Julien, founding partner, Julien & Schlesinger, P.C.
 Robert M. Kaufman, 1957, partner at Proskauer Rose, and President of the New York City Bar Association.
Lydia Kess 1962, first woman partner, Davis Polk & Wardwell LLP; currently senior counsel.
Gerald B. Lefcourt, 1967, criminal defense lawyer.
Richard Raysman, 1973, founding member of Thelen Reid Brown Raysman & Steiner
Gerald Shargel, 1969, criminal defense lawyer; Practitioner-in-Residence at Brooklyn Law School.

Sports

Nikki Dryden, 2005, Olympic swimmer, 3-time Pan Am Games silver medal winner, 3-time World Cup gold medal winner
Jeffrey B. Gewirtz, 1994, Senior Vice President & General Counsel, New Jersey Nets
Timothy Kelly, 2005, former General Manager for the Long Island Lizards of Major League Lacrosse; current General Manager of the New York Titans of the National Lacrosse League.
Yuliya Levitan, 2006, a Woman International Master in chess
Chris Massey, 2004, attackman who played professional field lacrosse in Major League Lacrosse
Pete Spanakos, bantamweight boxer who won a bronze medal at the 1959 Pan American Games
Lonn A. Trost, 1971, Chief Operating Officer & General Counsel, New York Yankees.

Other

Randall Amster, 1991, author, activist, and educator
Morton J. Gold, 1949, US Air Force Brigadier General 
 Harry Halpern, 1926, prominent Conservative rabbi
 Rosalie Gardiner Jones, 1919, socialite and suffragist.
Alexander Lowen, 1936, physician and psychotherapist
 Mickey Marcus, 1934, Colonel in the U.S. Army, first General of the Israeli Army
 Monique Mehta, 2006, humanitarian and political activist
 Robert Rosenthal, 1941, decorated Jewish USAF B-17 commander flew 53 missions, despite shot down twice; later assisted U.S. prosecutor at Nuremberg

Costs
The total cost of attendance (indicating the cost of tuition, fees, and living expenses) at Brooklyn Law School for the 2022-23 academic year is $95,271.  The estimated debt-financed cost of attendance for three years is $204,197.

See also
 Law of New York

References

External links
 

Robert A. M. Stern buildings
Education in Brooklyn
Educational institutions established in 1901
1901 establishments in New York City
Private universities and colleges in New York City
Brooklyn Law School
Independent law schools in the United States
Universities and colleges in Brooklyn
Brooklyn Heights